NGC 5078 is a spiral galaxy in the Hydra constellation, approximately 94 million light-years away from Earth. It has a diameter of 127,000 light-years and is probably a member of the NGC 5061 group. The dust lane of NGC 5078 is warped, probably by interaction with the nearby galaxy IC 879, which is itself distorted into an 'S' shape by the interaction. At the presumed distance the two galaxies would have a minimal separation of about 61,000 light-years. For comparison, the Large Magellanic Cloud is about 160,000 light-years from the Milky Way.

References

External links

 

Unbarred spiral galaxies
Hydra (constellation)
5078
46490